Cater may refer to:

 Catering, the business of providing food service at a remote site

Buildings
 Cater Hall, a historic building at Auburn University in Alabama, United States
 Cater Museum, a museum in Billericay, Essex, England

Companies and organizations
 Cater Allen, a British private bank
 Cater Brothers, a former British supermarket chain

People

Surname
 Monte Cater (born 1949), American football coach
 Danny Cater (born 1940), American Major League Baseball player
 Douglass Cater (1923–1995), American journalist
 Eugene R. Cater (1923–1990), American politician
 Jack Cater (1922–2002), British colonial administrator, Chief Secretary of Hong Kong from 1978 to 1981
 John Cater (born 1932), English actor
 Mojca Cater (born 1970), Canadian swimmer
 Nick Cater, Australian journalist